The 1934–35 United States collegiate men's ice hockey season was the 41st season of collegiate ice hockey in the United States.

Regular season

Standings

References

1934–35 NCAA Standings

External links
College Hockey Historical Archives

1934–35 United States collegiate men's ice hockey season
College